The Kurdistan Region national football team, is the national team of Kurdistan Region. They are not affiliated with FIFA or Asian Football Confederation (AFC). The Iraqi Football Association (FA) attended a meeting held by the NF-Board in June 2006.

History
The team played in the 2008 VIVA World Cup for the first time, finishing in the 4th place after a 3–1 loss to Sápmi. Their first and only win in the 2008 tournament came against Provence.

In December 2008, during the 5th General Meeting, Kurdistan was granted full membership to the NF Board and was a failed candidate to host the 2010 VIVA World Cup. After losing in the final in both the 2009 and 2010 tournaments Kurdistan eventually became champions on home turf in 2012, defeating Northern Cyprus 2–1 in front of 22,000 fans.

Official Kurdistan FA Emblem
The Kurdistan Region FA emblem was designed by Kurdish artist Rawand Sirwan Nawroly . The emblem represents the Kurdish flag colours, where the red represents the Kurdish Newroz fire. The yellow ball represents the Kurdish Sun and the green banner represents the green Kurdistan scenery.

Competitive record

Current squad

Managers

References

CONIFA member associations
Asian national and official selection-teams not affiliated to FIFA
Football in Kurdistan